Vanimo-Green River District is a district of Sandaun Province of Papua New Guinea.  Its capital is Vanimo.

References

Districts of Papua New Guinea
Sandaun Province